Bonnières may refer to:
 Bonnières, Oise, France
 Bonnières, Pas-de-Calais, France
 Bonnières-sur-Seine, Yvelines, France